Kania  is a genus of evergreen shrubs in the myrtle family Myrtaceae described as a genus in 1914. The entire genus is native to New Guinea and the Philippines.

Species

References

Myrtaceae
Myrtaceae genera
Flora of New Guinea
Flora of the Philippines